Uzovo may refer to:

 Uzovo, Bulgaria
 Uzovo (Bujanovac), village in the municipality of Bujanovac, Serbia